Brian Michael Knight (born October 2, 1974) is an American professional baseball umpire. He has worked as a full-time Major League Baseball (MLB) umpire since 2011. He wears uniform number 91.

Umpiring career
From 2001 to 2010, Knight was a minor league umpire who substituted as needed in the major leagues. His minor league service included the Pioneer, Midwest, Florida State, Southern, and Pacific Coast Leagues. He umpired the Tokyo in 2006 World Baseball Classic.

Knight umpired in the 2012 All-Star Game and the 2013 American League Wild Card Game, serving as the right field umpire under the tutelage of crew chief Gerry Davis on both occasions. Knight's first postseason game, the 2013 AL Wild Card, was played on his 39th birthday. Knight has also umpired in three Division Series (2014, 2015, 2021).

Notable games
Knight was the home plate umpire for Jon Lester's no-hitter in 2008, and Josh Beckett's in 2014.

On April 18, 2015, he was hit in the face by a pitch by Blake Treinen in a game between the Nationals and Philadelphia Phillies. The 96 MPH fastball was missed by Jose Lobaton and knocked him to the ground.

Personal life
Knight attended Capital High School in Helena, Montana and William Jewell College before enrolling in umpire school in 1995.

See also 

List of Major League Baseball umpires

References

External links
Major League profile
Retrosheet

1974 births
Living people
William Jewell College alumni
Major League Baseball umpires
Sportspeople from Helena, Montana